Buddika Janith (born 3 February 1989) is a Sri Lankan cricketer. He made his List A debut for Hambantota District in the 2016–17 Districts One Day Tournament on 24 March 2017.

References

External links
 

1989 births
Living people
Sri Lankan cricketers
Hambantota District cricketers
Sebastianites Cricket and Athletic Club cricketers
Cricketers from Colombo